Patrick Danahy (born March 7, 1985) is a former American rugby union player. Danahy played both the lock and flanker positions. 
He currently plays for the Mosman Whales in NSW, Australia. He was selected to tour with the USA national rugby union team, the USA Eagles XV, for the Autumn 2010 tour of Europe. Patrick's debut game for his country was at the U21 level on 21 June 2007 against Canada, only six months after he first stepped onto the rugby pitch at his alma mater of Stanford University. He earned a spot on the 30 man roster for the 2011 Rugby World Cup. Though he was forced to sit out the first final following a third yellow card in the competition, Danahy and the Mosman Whales won the 2016 and 2019 Kentwell Cups in the NSW Suburban Rugby competition during his tenure as captain.

References

External links
 Player Profile eaglesxv.com
 Life University Player Profile usarugby.org

1985 births
Living people
American rugby union players
United States international rugby union players
Rugby union locks
Rugby union flankers